WBKL may refer to:

 WBKL (FM), a radio station (92.7 FM) licensed to Clinton, Louisiana, United States
 Labuan Airport (ICAO code WBKL)